Firebase Maureen (also known as Hill 980) is a former U.S. Army firebase in the A Sầu Valley southwest of Huế in central Vietnam.

History
The base was established overlooking the A Sầu Valley, 32 km southwest of Huế.

The base was first established by the 101st Airborne Division in May 1970 to support Operation Texas Star. On 7 May 1970 the base was defended by a platoon of the 1st Battalion, 506th Infantry when it was attacked by a People's Army of Vietnam (PAVN) force. Private Kenneth Michael Kays was awarded the Medal of Honor for his actions during the battle.

The base was reopened in April 1971 as part of Operation Lam Son 720.

Current use
The base has reverted to jungle.

References

Installations of the United States Army in South Vietnam
Buildings and structures in Thừa Thiên Huế province